Kaliya jue Temple dedicated to the Hindu God Krishna is located in the town of Dinajpur, Bangladesh. The temple is situated to the west side of the Dinajpur Rajbari.

References

Hindu temples in Dinajpur district